Kamini Kumar Dutta (1878–1959) was a Bengali politician and former Law Minister of Pakistan.

Early life
Dutta was born on 25 June 1878 in Sreekail, Muradnagar Upazila, Comilla District, Bengal Presidency, British India. He studied at Chittagong Government High School. In 1898, he graduated from Ripon College, Calcutta and received a B.law degree from the University of Calcutta.

Career
In 1901, Dutta joined the Comilla District bar. He joined Calcutta High Court in 1918 as an advocate. He was involved with the Indian National Congress. He was involved with the Non-cooperation movement and the Swadeshi movement. He was arrested a number of times by the imperial police for his activism. In 1937, he was elected to the Bengal Legislative Council. In May 1938, he conveyed the All-India Peasants' Conference and served as the President of the Reception Committee in Comila. In 1938, he convened the All-Bengal and Assam Lawyers' Association meeting in Comila. He presided over the  All-Bengal and Assam Lawyers' Association conference next year in Khulna. He served in the Comilla District Board.

Following the Noakhali riots, Dutta served as the president of Tippera District Relief, Rescue and Rehabilitation Committee, that was created to aid the victims of the riot. In 1954, he was elected to the East Pakistan Provincial Legislative Assembly. In 1956, he served in the Basic Principles Committee which framed the first constitution of Pakistan. From August 1955 to September 1956, he served as the Law Minister of Pakistan under Prime Minister Chaudhry Muhammad Ali. He converted his home into a hostel for women, Mrnalini Chhatri-Nibas, named after his wife Mrinalini Datta.

Death
Dutta died on 4 January 1959. There is a Kamini Kumar Dutta Memorial Law Lecture at the University of Dhaka.

References

1878 births
1959 deaths
People from Comilla District
University of Calcutta alumni
Pakistani MNAs 1955–1958
Pakistani MNAs 1947–1954
Members of the Constituent Assembly of Pakistan
Lawyers in British India